El Ràfol de Salem is a municipality in the comarca of Vall d'Albaida in the Valencian Community, Spain.

The land has been occupied since prehistoric times, as evidenced by the pottery shards found in the Rafol mountains.

References 

Municipalities in the Province of Valencia
Vall d'Albaida